This list of museums in Utah encompasses museums defined for this context as institutions (including nonprofit organizations, government entities, and private businesses) that collect and care for objects of cultural, artistic, scientific, or historical interest and make their collections or related exhibits available for public viewing. Also included are non-profit and university art galleries. (Websites are listed for museums with no existing articles.) Museums that exist only in cyberspace (i.e., virtual museums) are not included.

Museums

Defunct museums
 Deseret Museum, Salt Lake City
 McCurdy Historical Doll Museum, Provo
 North Box Elder County Museum, Tremonton 
 Railroad Village Museum, Corinne
 Riverton Museum at the Crane House, Riverton
 Roy Historical Museum, Roy 
 Southern Utah Air Museum, Washington

See also

 Arboreta in Utah (category)
 Botanical gardens in Utah (category)
 Historic landmarks in Utah
 Houses in Utah (category)
 Forts in Utah (category)
 Museums list
 Nature Centers in Utah
 Registered Historic Places in Utah

Notes

Resources
 Utah Museums Association Directory of Museums in Utah
 State of Utah Museums page

Museums
Utah
Museums